Scopula privata is a moth of the  family Geometridae. It is found in Venezuela and Peru.

References

Moths described in 1861
privata
Moths of South America